Winton Community Academy (formerly Winton School) is a mixed secondary school located in Andover in the English county of Hampshire.

History
The school converted to academy status on 1 November 2012 and was renamed Winton Community Academy. It had been known as Winton School, and was a community school under the direct control of Hampshire County Council. The school continues to coordinate with Hampshire County Council for admissions, but has been sponsored by the Academies Enterprise Trust since 2012.

Academic Standards
This table shows the proportion of pupils achieving 5 GCSEs A-C (including English and Maths). Data is taken from the November 2015 datasets held by the Department for Education, as indicated in the footnotes. School and College Performance Tables,.

Cells coloured red represent 5 GCSE A-C (including English and Maths) results which are below the minimum standards expected by the Government floor target, OFSTED grades which indicate standards need to be improved or Department for Education letters stating that standards are 'unacceptably low.' Cells in darker grey indicate schools which have left AET or data which arose for periods of time before or after the schools were part of AET.

Winton's first set of results as an AET Academy saw 36% of students achieve 5 GCSES A-C (including English and Maths). As this figure fell short of the minimum standards outlined in the government’s floor target of 40% 5 GCSEs A-C (including English and Maths), the headteacher Chris McShane, resigned.  The academy was placed into Special Measures by OFSTED, which stated that: 

In November 2013 Lord Nash, on behalf of the Department for Education, issued a Pre-Warning Notice to the Academies Enterprise Trust stating that: 

The Academies Enterprise Trust appointed Sharon Watts as interim principal to lead on improvements at the academy.  But exam results fell still further in summer 2014, dropping to 33% 5 GCSEs A-C (including English and Maths).  In the Autumn of 2014 Nathan Thomas was appointed as the new principal and led the academy through a successful OFSTED inspection. Thomas stated:  

In order to bring about improvement the academy introduced new teaching techniques, including days when students did not use pens. There was also a focus on introducing house captains and getting students more involved in the running of the school. Newly appointed Head Girl Alice Stone stated: 'It’s great because we really get listened to and we are able to make a real difference…'  Newly appointed head boy Tom Cox said: 'It really feels like our opinions matter and what we say will help us to improve the school…'

However concerns remained about how the academy was doing and so in April 2015 Sir George Young, the outgoing MP, and his successor Kit Malthouse met with Ian Comfort, the head of Academies Enterprise Trust in order to stress the importance of raising standards at Winton Community College.  Sir George stated:

In the summer of 2015, despite well publicised efforts to improve attendance, optimistic predictions and claims by OFSTED that standards were improving, Academy results fell further and only 26% of pupils achieved 5GCSEs A-C (including English and Maths). This meant that Winton Community Academy remained, for the third year in a row, below the Government minimum standards for schools (known as the 'floor target')

Extra Curricular Life
In 2014 the academy put on a performance of Dick Wittington funding its expansion of the arts through charity activities such as bag packing at local supermarkets. Although in Sept 2013 a fire caused serious damage to Winton Academy,  this did not prevent the academy going on to open a new Sports and Rugby centre.  During 2015 there was a significant drive to improve library facilities  and Dame Lucy Jeanne Neville-Rolfe visited the school to give advice on business and entrepreneurship.

The role of the sponsor
Academies Enterprise Trust support for Academies at the local level is led by the AET Regional Director of Education (known as a RDE). The 2014 OFSTED report about AET explained that ‘some academy leaders said that there was too much variability in the support and challenge offered by Regional Directors employed by AET.'. In September 2015 an Ofsted inspection at Winton Academy noted that: 

During 2015 the RDE for Winton Community Academy was Elizabeth (Libby) Nicholas. Libby Nicholas was previously a deputy headteacher at an Independent girls school, Sutton High School and then an interim headteacher at independent girls school South Hampstead High School during the summer term in 2013. In December 2015 it was announced that she was leaving Academies Enterprise Trust in order to join Reach4, a new Multi Academy Trust.

References

Secondary schools in Hampshire
Academies in Hampshire
Academies Enterprise Trust